Ectopatria subrufescens is a moth of the family Noctuidae. It is found in South Australia, Victoria and Western Australia.

The wingspan is about 30 mm.

The larvae feed on Bromus unioloides.

External links
Australian Faunal Directory
Australian Insects

Moths of Australia
Noctuinae
Moths described in 1865